Hufel-e Gharbi (also Romanized as Hūfel-e Gharbī; also known as Hoofol, Howfel, and Hūfel) is a village in Allah-o Akbar Rural District, in the Central District of Dasht-e Azadegan County, Khuzestan Province, Iran. At the 2006 census, its population was 1,081, in 156 families.

References 

Populated places in Dasht-e Azadegan County